Mikhaylovka is a rural locality (a khutor) in Polyakovsky Selsoviet, Davlekanovsky District, Bashkortostan, Russia. The population was 22 as of 2010.

Geography 
Mikhaylovka is located 11 km northeast of Davlekanovo (the district's administrative centre) by road. Vperyod is the nearest rural locality.

References 

Rural localities in Davlekanovsky District